The long-tailed cisticola (Cisticola angusticauda), also known as the Tabora cisticola, is a species of bird in the family Cisticolidae. It is found in Africa, where it occurs in the Democratic Republic of the Congo, Kenya, Malawi, Mozambique, Rwanda, Tanzania, Uganda, and Zambia. Its natural habitat is dry savanna.

References

long-tailed cisticola
Birds of Southern Africa
long-tailed cisticola
Taxonomy articles created by Polbot